The Mark of Cain is a British Academy of Film and Television Arts Award-winning British television film first broadcast in 2007 following three young men as they experience the extremity of war for the first time, and the permanent effects of what they have seen and done as they return from their tour of duty. Rather than heroic stories, all they bring home are tawdry trophy photos, as well as the secrets of what they really did, until the consequences of their actions surface to confront them.

Produced by Red Production Company, it was originally scheduled on Channel 4 at 9 pm on 5 April 2007, but was rescheduled to 12 April 2007, in light of the detention of British service personnel by Iran. The film's title comes from Royal Irish Regiment Colonel Tim Collins's eve-of-battle speech in Iraq in 2003.

Plot
The film begins with Private Shane Gulliver (Matthew McNulty) of the 1st Battalion, Northdale Rifles marching to a court martial. The film then cuts to Gulliver's arrival in Basra, Iraq with fellow soldier Mark Tate (Gerard Kearns). Once there, they are briefed by their commanding officer (CO), Major Godber (Shaun Dingwall), who tells them to treat the people of Iraq with respect. While on patrol the troops are ambushed by insurgents, and the men witness the death of their CO whilst trying to rescue a Territorial Army private who is struck with shock while in a Land Rover and is incapable of taking cover. After this the troops receive reports that the insurgents came from a village nearby.

When the troops arrive in the said village, they arrest several men suspected of being insurgents, and take them back to their base. Once there, they are told to leave the prisoners to the Royal Military Police (RMP), but due to their anger over the death of their major, they begin to beat, torture and sexually abuse them. When Corporal Gant (Shaun Dooley) orders a reluctant Tate to join the troops he refuses at first, but is bullied into helping them. During the torture, Gulliver takes some photographs.

After the torture scene, we see as they arrive home, they resume their normal lives, during which Gulliver shows his girlfriend the pictures of the torture. After she discovers that he has been cheating on her, she reports him to the civilian police. Gant, Gulliver and Tate are subsequently arrested by the RMP.

Gant is fined, while the two privates are court-martialed. Upon hearing this, Tate kills himself. In the final scene of the film, we see Gulliver's trial, he pleads guilty to all charges, but rather than solely take the blame he tells the court what Gant and the other soldiers did. When Gulliver is returned to his cell, he is beaten by his fellow soldiers. He is then put in prison.

Cast
 Barry Sloane as Glynn
 Matthew McNulty as Shane Gulliver
 Gerard Kearns as Mark "Treacle" Tate
 Leo Gregory as L/Cpl Quealy
 Shaun Dooley as Corporal Gant
 Naomi Bentley as Shelley
 Shaun Dingwall as Major Godber
 Dhaffer L'Abidine as Omar Abdullah
 Alistair Petrie as Major Rod Gilchrist

Reception

Critical response
 Good early reviews from variety.com.
 Won a BAFTA 2008 April 2008
 US Premiere at the Red Rock Film Festival 15 November 2008

Awards and nominations
 Amnesty International's Movies That Matter award at International Film Festival Rotterdam
Southbank Show award for best TV drama of 2007
Bafta Award for best single drama 2008

See also
 Death of Baha Mousa

References

External links

2007 television films
2007 films
British television films
Channel 4 original programming
Iraq War films
Iraq War in television
Films directed by Marc Munden
Films shot in Greater Manchester
2000s English-language films